Asher Brown Durand (August 21, 1796, – September 17, 1886) was an American painter of the Hudson River School.

Early life
Durand was born in, and eventually died in, Maplewood, New Jersey (then called Jefferson Village). He was the eighth of eleven children. Durand's father was a watchmaker and a silversmith.

Durand was apprenticed to an engraver from 1812 to 1817 and later entered into a partnership with the owner of the company, Charles Cushing Wright (1796–1854), who asked him to manage the company's New York office. He engraved Declaration of Independence for John Trumbull during 1823, which established Durand's reputation as one of the country's finest engravers.  Durand helped organize the New York Drawing Association in 1825, which would become the National Academy of Design; he would serve the organization as president from 1845 to 1861.

Asher's engravings on bank notes were used as the portraits for America's first postage stamps, the 1847 series.  Along with his brother Cyrus he also engraved some of the succeeding 1851 issues.

Painting career
Durand's main interest changed from engraving to oil painting about 1830 with the encouragement of his patron, Luman Reed. In 1837, he accompanied his friend Thomas Cole on a sketching expedition to Schroon Lake in the Adirondacks Mountains, and soon after he began to concentrate on landscape painting. He spent summers sketching in the Catskills, Adirondacks, and the White Mountains of New Hampshire, making hundreds of drawings and oil sketches that were later incorporated into finished academy pieces which helped to define the Hudson River School.

Durand is remembered particularly for his detailed portrayals of trees, rocks, and foliage. He was an advocate for drawing directly from nature with as much realism as possible. Durand wrote, "Let [the artist] scrupulously accept whatever [nature] presents him until he shall, in a degree, have become intimate with her infinity...never let him profane her sacredness by a willful departure from truth."

Like other Hudson River School artists, Durand also believed that nature was an ineffable manifestation of God. He expressed this sentiment and his general opinions on art in his essay "Letters on Landscape Painting" in The Crayon, a mid-19th century New York art periodical. Wrote Durand, "[T]he true province of Landscape Art is the representation of the work of God in the visible creation..."Durand is noted for his 1849 painting Kindred Spirits which shows fellow Hudson River School artist Thomas Cole and poet William Cullen Bryant in a Catskills Mountains landscape.  This was painted as a tribute to Cole upon Cole's death in 1848 and a gift to Bryant.  The painting, donated by Bryant's daughter Julia to the New York Public Library in 1904, was sold by the library using Sotheby's at an auction in May 2005 to Alice Walton for a purported $35 million  (the sale was performed as a sealed, first bid auction, so the actual sales price is not known).  At $35 million, however, it would be a record price paid for an American painting at the time.
Another of Durand's paintings is Progress (1853), commissioned by a railroad executive. The landscape depicts America's progress, from a state of nature (on the left, where Native Americans look on), towards the right, where there are roads, telegraph wires, a canal, warehouses, railroads, and steamboats. In December 2018, it was purchased by an anonymous donor for an estimated $40 million and given to the Virginia Museum of Fine Arts.

In 2007, the Brooklyn Museum exhibited nearly sixty of Durand's works in the first monographic exhibition devoted to the painter in more than thirty-five years.  The show, entitled "Kindred Spirits: Asher B. Durand and the American Landscape," was exhibited from March 30 to July 29, 2007. Durand is interred in Brooklyn, New York, in Green-Wood Cemetery.

Gallery

External video

See also

List of Hudson River School artists

References

Further reading
Books

Newspapers

Online Publications
 Avery, Kevin J. “Asher Brown Durand (1796–1886).” In Heilbrunn Timeline of Art History. New York: The Metropolitan Museum of Art, 2000–. (October 2009)

External links

Smithsonian Institution, Asher B. Durand Biography 
The Asher B. Durand Print Collection at the New York Historical Society 
White Mountain paintings by Asher Brown Durand
Biography of Asher Brown Durand on White Mountain Art & Artists
Artcyclopedia: Paintings in Museums and Public Art Galleries
Art Archive - Asher Brown Durand
New York Historical Society - Lee A. Vedder, Luce Curatorial Fellow in American Art
Alfred L. Brophy, "Property and Progress: Antebellum Landscape Art and Property Law," McGeorge Law Review 40 (2009): 601-59.
Reynolda House Museum of American Art
Art and the empire city: New York, 1825-1861, an exhibition catalog from The Metropolitan Museum of Art (fully available online as PDF), which contains extensive material on Durand (see index)
American paradise: the world of the Hudson River school, an exhibition catalog from The Metropolitan Museum of Art (fully available online as PDF), which contains material on Durand (see index)
 Green-Wood Cemetery Burial Search
 

1796 births
1886 deaths
19th-century American painters
American male painters
Burials at Green-Wood Cemetery
Hudson River School painters
American romantic painters
American landscape painters
People from Maplewood, New Jersey
People from South Orange, New Jersey
Davy Crockett
Articles containing video clips